Angus McLaren Meikle (born 7 February 1900) was a Scottish professional footballer who played as a winger. he played in the Scottish Football League for Heart of Midlothian and in the Football League for Portsmouth and Grimsby Town.

References

1900 births
Footballers from South Lanarkshire
Sportspeople from Larkhall
Scottish footballers
Association football wingers
Larkhall United F.C. players
Royal Albert F.C. players
Heart of Midlothian F.C. players
Portsmouth F.C. players
Grimsby Town F.C. players
Bangor City F.C. players
Coalburn Juniors F.C. players
English Football League players
Scottish Football League players
Scottish Junior Football Association players
Year of death missing